Chakan may refer to:
 Chakan, alternate name of Chakanak, Gilan Province (چاكان - Chākān)
 Chakan, East Azerbaijan (چكن - Chakan)
 Chakan, Maragheh, East Azerbaijan Province (چكان - Chakān)
 Chakan, Lorestan (چكان - Chakān)